Paroster caecus is blind beetle in the Hydroporini tribe of the subfamily Hydroporinae  in the Dytiscidae family. It was first described by Chris Watts in 1982 as Terradessus caecus. It was transferred to the genus, Paroster, in 2016 by Toussaint, Hendrich and others.

It is known only from the type locality, Mount Sorrow, Cape Tribulation in Queensland.

References

Beetles described in 1982